= Lipschitz v Wolpert and Abrahams =

South African legal case

In Lipschitz and Another NNO v Wolpert and Abrahams an important case in South African law, the auditors of a company in liquidation were sued under section 184 of the Companies Act to contribute an amount in excess of R3 million to the company's assets as compensation. An exception was successfully filed to the particulars of claim on the basis that an auditor, appointed under section 98 (1) of the 1926 Companies Act, was not an "officer of the company" within the meaning of the phrase in section 184 (1). Holmes JA quoted section 184(1) to the following effect:

Where in the course of winding-up a company it appears that any person who has taken part in the formation or promotion of the company, or any past or present director, manager or liquidator, or any officer of the company, has misapplied or retained or become liable or accountable for any money or property of the company, or been guilty of any misfeasance or breach of trust in relation to the company, the Court may, on the application of the Master or of the liquidator or of any creditor or contributory, examine into the conduct of the promoter, director, manager, liquidator, or officer, and compel him to repay or restore the money or property or any part thereof, respectively with interest at such rate as the Court thinks just, or to contribute such sum to the assets of the company by way of compensation in respect of the misapplication, retention, misfeasance or breach of trust as the Court thinks just.
